Gustaf Peter Lundblad (26 August 1950 – 22 December 2015) was a Swedish singer and songwriter, well known for his 1986 song Ta mig till havet. Lundblad started his career in the band 'The most Remarkable Nailband' where Lasse Tennander appeared as songwriter. Later they started the band 'Duga' but Tennander left the band quickly. In 1978, Lundblad and Torbjörn wrote and recorded the song Who Will Comfort Toffle? which also is a children's book written by Tove Jansson. Together with Agneta Olsson, Lundblad competed in Melodifestivalen 1983 with the song Vill du ha mig efter gryningen.

Lundblad died of prostate cancer, on 22 December 2015, aged 65.

Discography

Albums

Singles

References

External links
Aftonbladet.se
Official website

20th-century Swedish male singers
Swedish songwriters
Swedish-language singers
1950 births
2015 deaths
21st-century Swedish male singers
Deaths from prostate cancer
Harvest Records artists
Melodifestivalen contestants of 1996